Hübener may refer to:

 Helmuth Hübener (1925–1942), a German Latter-day Saint and Nazi resister, and the youngest opponent of the Third Reich sentenced to death by the Volksgerichtshof
 Erhard Hübener (1881–1958), an East German politician
 Thomas Hübener (born 1982), a German footballer